Operation Maki Mirage or Maki-Mirage was a Soviet intelligence operation that involved about 1200 Soviet spies being sent to China (chiefly Manchuria) and Korea to perform intelligence gathering, "special tasks," and disinformation. The operation occurred primarily during the Interwar period, starting in the 1920s and continued into World War II. According to Soviet literature, the NKVD placed moles inside Japanese anti-Soviet operations, which allegedly involved 200 Japanese agents in the Soviet Far East. A notable aspect of the operation was the employ of East Asian agents as over 600 Soviet Koreans and Soviet Chinese were sent to spy on the Japanese Empire. The operation can be placed in the context of the Soviet Union utilizing their diaspora nationalities (i.e. non-Eastern Slav peoples or narody such as Greeks, Finns, Germans, Poles, Chinese, Turks, Koreans, Iranians and many others), otherwise treated as "last among socialist equals" and subject to forced deportations. However in Russian historiography and documentary portrayals, the participation of over 600 East Asian agents was virtually ignored.

Summary

Background 

The Soviet Union had a vast human intelligence program and a succession of secret police agencies. Operation Maki-Mirage existed in a background of false flag or "deception operations" primarily aimed at convincing "counter-revolutionary" forces to come to the country and be entrapped in a false anti-Soviet group. Examples such operations included Operation Trust, Operation Syndicate-2, and the Tagantsev conspiracy. Maki-Mirage, however, was not a false flag operation. It was for the most part an aggressive forward operation in intelligence (undertaking assassination, recruitment, reconnaissance, destruction of socio-political personages, targets and other measures) to disrupt and instill fear that the existing regimes in China and the Japanese empire could not rule and protect their citizens.

The Chinese-Lenin School of Vladivostok was established for the official purpose of educating Chinese students into comrades of socialism. It was one of the major espionage training centers of the Soviet Union, opened in late 1924 and running until early 1938. Its students included Red Army veterans, generally Soviet Koreans and Soviet Chinese born or raised in the USSR (the Soviet Chinese were typically born in China and came to the USSR as children or adolescents in the period of the 1920s-1930s), and Chinese students from China recruited in the USSR.

The Soviet Union saw diaspora peoples as allegedly disloyal leading to numerous deportations, including the Soviet deportation of Koreans and Soviet deportations of Chinese. Nonetheless, Soviet secret police employed many diaspora peoples in espionage operations, with major examples including the German-Soviet spy Rudolf Abel (originally William Fisher) and the Ingrian Finnish-Soviet spy Reino Häyhänen. Moreover, this was not the first Maki Mirage-like operation (using Soviet natsmen) for William Fisher. Sometime shortly after Aug. 1939 Molotov–Ribbentrop Pact, Fisher (a Baltic German) and Adamovich (a Soviet Pole) were sent to Ukraine to meet ethnic Germans, Poles and Ukrainians to stir up anti-Nazi sentiment in the nearby areas and countries. They proclaimed to be refugees from communism during the invasion of Poland, using a provision that Nazi Germany and the USSR had agreed upon for the migration of Soviet Germans. Jerzy Niezbrzycki (who worked in Polish intelligence as Niezbrzyski, while using the pseudonym Ryszard Wraga when working for U.S. academia) mentioned the capture of a Soviet Pole working under the administration of the INO, NKVD. This man was from Ukraine and spoke Polish with a slight accent (assumed Ukrainian or Russian). He was captured in Poland, agreed to work as a double agent, but then reneged and agreed to a jail term in Poland rather than a return to Russia. The Soviet Pole (Niezbrzski's) and Häyhänen went to great lengths to build their "legends," that is, backstory as locals. The Pole spent lavishly on his girlfriend taking trips to Warsaw with fine dining, cabarets and other assorted nightlife that were part of courtship and "good living." The intent was to marry a local in order to obtain citizenship, the right residency and work permits and have a layer of protection from suspicion. Häyhänen padded his "legend" by going to extreme lengths, even though he had one significant advantage over the Pole as Soviet agents. Reino spoke Finnish as a native speaker. First, Reino along with a Soviet agent (from Lapland) headed north to the Arctic Circle. There, they found Sámi who were willing to corroborate (for a fee) his residence and work in Lapland from 1943 to 1949. Heading south to Tampere, he then courted and married a local Finnish girl, Hanna Kurikka. Anna Chapman would utilize many of the same tactics while eclipsing all of her predecessors, the previous Russian Federation and Soviet illegals in regards to her ability to charm, deceive and induce credulity in her hosts. Her male friends in America stated that they believed that she was an American despite obvious telltale giveaways such as her foreign accent and Russian mannerisms.

The diaspora peoples were utilized by Soviet intelligence because they possessed cultural and linguistic knowledge (and for some, the knowledge of many different registers within a particular language or culture). These are knowledge, abilities and nuances that one cannot simply learn in a controlled, artificial environment like a classroom nor in a lockstep manner. Finally, they possessed the right phenotype to play their roles. Truthfully, they had played these "ethnic" roles from the beginning of their Soviet education (detskii sad-preschool) and their first Soviet passports and documents (the Soviet passport, their military ID's and even housing documents- the propiska) listed ethnicity called natsional'nost.

The History, "Capricious" Loyalties and Difficulties of Conducting Soviet Espionage in Manchuria  
In Operation Maki-Mirage, East Asian and "Russian" agents were both sent to China (largely Manchuria) and Korea to perform espionage in groups of up to a dozen. The "Russian" agents were seen with suspicion in East Asia, but most importantly, those in Manchuria (Manchukuo by early 1932) were too conspicuous. Most Soviet GRU and OGPU/NKVD agents (the "Russians") spoke a smattering of Chinese and (less common) Japanese which was often difficult to understand despite the fact that they may have finished courses in the language in Russia at "Oriental Institutes." For these agents, the majority of their contacts were within the "Russian" and former Tsarist citizen communities in Manchuria. Their "Russian" informants (being a mixture of Russians, Ukrainians, Georgians, Tatars, Jews and others) also informed on them because their goal was simply to earn a living and survive economically. Information was their currency and means of sustenance.

Most former Tsarist citizens, Whites (White Guards) and the so-called "Russians" (a wide encompassing term) in Manchuria did not have strong and or clearly defined loyalties to the Soviet regime despite many "Russians" and Russian speakers taking Soviet citizenship from 1925 onwards and many returning to the USSR after 1935. After 1920, the greatest need was simply to eat and find a means of sustenance. Many professed "sudden" loyalties to the Soviets as the lesser of two evils, for example, when faced with unemployment or when faced with the ever increasing power and clout exercised by the Japanese or Chinese. Mara Moustafine stated that around 1925, a new Soviet law was promulgated which required that those Russians who wanted to work for the CER (Chinese Eastern Railway in Manchuria/Manchukuo) must take either Chinese or Soviet citizenship. Many Whites of Harbin/Manchuria took Soviet citizenship. However, these people were often called "radishes" signifying that they were "Reds" by passport, but "Whites" (White Guard) by politics, culture and ethos. This was a popular sobriquet at the time for everyone in Manchuria working for a business, enterprise, organization and or educational institution tied to the Soviet regime (not just CER employees).

Mark Gamsa explained that the Cossacks of Manchuria had begun working for the Chinese (Qing government, warlords and military) beginning in 1685. The Russians and Russian speakers of Manchuria had to survive. The economic life of Manchuria was simply "catch as catch-can," that is, one was to use whatever resources that one could gather to survive. Thus, for many who practiced Cossack, Mongol or Turkic martial traditions or whose forefathers came from a military tradition (whether the defeated Whites or other factions under the Tsar), they could tap into this heritage and ethos to earn a living as a soldier. Many young Russians began their military careers in all-Russian regiments serving the Japanese and various Chinese warlords since 1920 when "Russians" (using the term broadly) lost the right of extraterritoriality in Manchuria. "Russians" served in Grigorii M. Semenov's Special Manchuria Detachments (and other regiments) beginning in 1918 along with a host of others (Mongols, Tungus, Kalmyks and Buryats from both Russia and Manchuria). Semenov's battalions served the Japanese, his benefactors. Manchuria from 1918 until at least 1949 was a place of many political intrigues and constantly shifting loyalties due to the lack of one stable government and rule of law. While many emigres were motivated by what they thought was a continuing fight against the Bolsheviks under the flag of tsarism, many of the Russians saw themselves simply as "mercenaries" always willing to sell their services and or information to the highest bidder. For example Konstantin Petrovich Nechaev (1883-1946) rejected the baggage of "White ideas," stating, "We are mercenaries, Landsknechte."

The U.S. intelligence report, "Japanese Intelligence on Soviet Intentions near End of World War II" noted that many White Russians had sold their services to both the Japanese (the Manchukuo regime) and the Soviets. It stated, "About two hundred White Russians were successfully used in Manchuria to translate incoming documents, but there were always Soviet agents among them, some of whom were not detected until to the end of the war. Therefore, the Japanese believe that the greatest caution should be used in employing White Russians in any classified intelligence work, especially in areas contiguous to Soviet territory or to Soviet-occupied areas."

The constantly shifting "sands" of political loyalty and power/authority, made the goal of deception and cover for Soviet intelligence nearly impossible. Thus, the Soviets pivoted towards their "natsmen" (means "national minority"- natsional'noe menshinstvo) agent-officers. In some cases, the East Asian Soviet agents performed and were required to perform the primary "special tasks" of reconnaissance, stealing and obtaining cipher machines/code books, assassination and blowing up relevant socio-political targets. In others (cases), they stayed in the background. Soviet state archives said that the operation was to combat 200 Japanese spies, but surrounding evidence suggests that the Soviet claim of counterintelligence there was likely a front for more forward operations. The Soviet operation utilized multiple layers of deception. Operationally, perhaps Operation Trust was on a greater scale (funding, monies, use of informants, agent-officers and especially analysts and admin. staff to influence or produce newspaper articles and printed or recorded media and disinformation).

However, tactically, (Operation) Maki Mirage was a clear advancement over previous operations. The Japanese had the Soviet agents on Manchukuo soil spotted, tailed and covered. At least some of the sigint (such as radio) was traced and intercepted. Whether these communications were interpreted and or deciphered correctly is a different issue. The larger question remains, "How were the Soviets able to undertake their 'special tasks' of assassinations, bombings, spying, and other acts of diversion, wrecking and political intrigue when almost all of the 'bases' were covered?" The Soviets were able to pull off their operations and attacks on foreign soil despite their rezidentura and all of its agent-officers and their various forms of communication being known, intercepted/exposed and covered. This page explains "how" and "why." It's not because of human diversity, but human diversity with applicable skills (the foundation was high intelligence and then people of dual or triple cultural backgrounds, identities and linguistic abilities). Many of the "Russian" agents reportedly reportedly spoke four, five and six languages, but Chang's interviews with some of the East Asians agent-officers revealed that these agents simply spoke a smattering of pidgin Chinese, Korean or Japanese, which could not pass as being fully conversant in that language (versus knowing various registers of a language: street, informal, formal, academic, business, technical, etc. and knowing when and which register is being spoken/used). Take for instance, this question, "how many agents spoke Chinese or Japanese versus how many agents claimed that they spoke Chinese or Japanese?" At best, for most agents, except those raised in Manchuria by (e.g.) a Chinese amah or with a retinue of servants and household staff, most knew what would be considered "kitchen" Chinese at best compared with native speakers. 

The background of the agents included East Asian (Korean and Chinese) and "Russian" agents (The term "Russian" refers more generally to Europeans from the USSR and former Russian empire to include Russians, Russified Ukrainians, Jews, Tatars, and Georgians). The East Asian agents could conduct their work and lives in Manchuria without suspicion and enter areas unnoticed (seen to be simply "locals"), while "Russian" agents were more conspicuous in their lives and relationships. The "Russians" were more likely to have relatives, associates and close friends with properties in Dalian, Harbin or elsewhere in Manchuria, limiting the capabilities to perform sabotage tasks without facing death, easy capture or retribution (the latter referring to capture, interrogation, torture and possible death to their friends, associates and relatives) meaning their tasks mainly involved convincing anti-Bolsheviks to return to the Soviet Union to join a fictitious rebel group.

During the Great Terror, most of the photos of Operation Maki-Mirage and similar operations were burned, during the domestic purges, 1936-1939, called the "Great Terror."

Historiography 

The historical background and data (information, facts, names, etc.) on the operation were kept secret until 1991. Post-Soviet historiography and documentary portrayals have omitted the East Asian contributions to Soviet history and intelligence. Historian Jon K. Chang performed interviews gathering family histories of Koreans in Central Asia and research corroborated by Soviet era photographs, that highlighted the roles of Soviet Koreans in the historical operation. He points out that the 2008 Russian film, Operatsiia: Agent Prizrak (Операция «Агент призрак») which focuses exclusively on the "Russian" (including other Russified European groups) agents, incidentally includes a shot with a list of names of agents in Operation Maki Mirage, which includes two of the omitted East Asian officers (EASI). Incidentally, they were two of the most important: Khan Chan Ger and Van In Zun. Khan and Van (Wang in English) were the leaders (nachal'niki) of the Korean and Chinese OPGU/NKVD regiments respectively. It was specifically mentioned in Khisamutdinov's The Russian Far East: Historical Essays that the Soviet Korean and Chinese deportations were carried out by Korean and Chinese regiments (respectively) of the NKVD in 1937-1938. (Khisamutdinov also gives other facts and data on the Korean and Chinese deportations). Chang sees the historiography of Operation Maki-Mirage as emblematic of how national minorities in the USSR had been minimized and neglected in history.

Operation Maki Mirage: The history of East Asians in Soviet intelligence

Background 

Maki Mirage was a Soviet intelligence operation conducted purportedly against Japanese intelligence in the Russian Far East. According to Soviet sources, the Japanese had some two hundred agents in the Zabaikal and Russian Far East regions collecting information and performing acts of espionage, information collection and sabotage. Upon further investigation, the Soviet claim of Maki Mirage being a Soviet "counter-intelligence" operation falls apart. They employed too few resources and agent-officers to oppose a force of two hundred who were supposedly already active on Soviet soil, while Soviet offensive espionage in Japan and elsewhere had been successful for many years.

 (b. 1899 Vladivostok) was a Soviet Korean raised and educated in Japan, who from 1922 was a secret agent of the GPU (State Political Directorate) codenamed "Marten", possibly being recruited as early as 1921 by the Cheka. As a Soviet agent, Kim performed extensive "counterespionage" missions ranging from ciphers to disinformation and other operations against Japan. He may have been involved in the forgery of the Tanaka Memorial. According to historian Hiroaki Kuromiya, it is possible that a blackmail plot on Michitaro Komatsubara masterminded by Roman Kim may have assisted the Soviet victory at Khalkin-gol in Mongolia in 1939. More definitively, Kim was in constant cooperation with the Soviet military intelligence in the 1930s. In 1934, Roman Kim had received the title of "honorable Chekist" and became agent for "special assignments" of the NKVD. This was supposedly to counter Japanese espionage on the European continent.

After years of serving the Soviet Union, Kim was arrested in the midst of the Great Purge in 1937 and accused of being a Japanese spy. Tortured in the jail of Lubianka, he went along with his interrogators' belief that he was a Japanese spy, spinning a desperate boastful tale convincing the secret police interrogators. Roman Kim 'confessed' that he was a Japanese espionage station chief and illegitimate son of a foreign minister, making him a valuable target. Filip Kovačević writes, "By contrast, all the other counterintelligence officers from his unit, all of his superiors, and even the NKVD officer who had signed his arrest order, were shot." Two years later, after the Soviet Union had killed nearly all of its specialists in Japanese and/or Korean, Kim was deployed as an agent again. When Lavrentiy Beria became NKVD chief in 1938, he freed Roman Kim and used him as a translator—he had acted as a translator even in his prison cell in Lubianka. In 1939, Beria sent Kim on another spy mission, in the midst of the Battle of Khalkin-gol. After WWII, Kim became an author of Soviet spy fiction, fighting a "literary Cold War".

According to historians Kuromiya and Peplonski, in the Great Terror, alleged "Japanese spies" (an accusation leveled mainly against Koreans and Chinese and employees of the CER) and "Polish spies" were both targeted disproportionately, even more so than the main, explicitly recognized threat of German spies.

In the years leading up to Molotov-Ribbentrop Pact, "because Germany was personally ruled by Hitler as the Soviet Union was by Stalin, Stalin found it easier to deal with Germany [than the Second Polish Republic or Japan]." The authors point out "NKVD statistics show that in 1937-1938, 101,965 people were arrested as Polish spies, 52,906 as Japanese spies and 39,300 as German spies to be followed by Latvian, Finnish, Estonian, Romanian, Greek and other 'spies.'"

Furthermore, "Polish-Japanese undercover work was serious enough to concern Stalin deeply. Iagoda, a past master of counterintelligence, carried out "Trest"-like [false flag] operations in the Far East, right up until the Great Terror, i.e., until he was replaced by Ezhov. Ezhov attacked Iagoda’s operations and decimated his foreign intelligence cadres". Besides "Maki-Mirage", the Soviets also operated a multitude of other proxy organizations to trick anti-Soviet forces, such as "Dreamers", "Shogun", and "Organizator" against Japan. In 1930, the Soviets had also operated a fake Japanese agent in 1930 in Ingushetia to entrap anti-Soviet "Polish" intelligence. Koreans residing and working in Ukraine were also being repressed and sentenced as "agents of Japanese espionage".

Soviet spy training schools 
There were various universities in the USSR that existed for the training of foreign communist cadres and intelligence operatives. Soviet agent Trepper stated that just among the students in Moscow at the four universities were between 2,000 and 3,000 students annually (though not all were to work in intelligence).

In The Great Game: The Story of the Red Orchestra, Leopold Trepper described four universities in Moscow which trained militants/students for espionage work in the 1920s to 1940s.Marchlevski University, where I was enrolled, was reserved for national minorities, and contained almost twenty sections: Polish, German, Hungarian, Bulgarian, and so on. Specialized groups of militants, belonging to the national minorities of the particular country, were attached to each section. The third university was Kutv University, for students from the Near East, and finally, Sun Yat Sen University [of Moscow] was reserved for the Chinese…. The students at the communist university were also given military training: the handling of weapons, exercises in shooting and in civil defense, the rudiments of chemical warfare.In addition, in the Russian Far East, there was the Chinese-Lenin School in Vladivostok with an enrollment of perhaps around 150-200 students per year (1933’s enrollment was 207 students. After 1935-36, this number would decrease drastically).

In the document below-right from the RGASPI archives (f.17, op. 162, d. 17, l. 151) entitled "The Politburo transfer of NKVD members working in Eastern Siberia and Central Asia to Xinjiang," there are listed the names of four to five Chinese NKVD officers (from Kashen to Lutskaya, Tatyana Kaspina may or may not have been Chinese). Tepliakov's monograph Stalin's Guardsmen (Oprichniki Stalina) gives a short biography (education and work history) regarding three of these officers as well as five other Chinese NKVD or GRU agents (including Lenintsev). Oprichniki Stalina also reveals a bit more of how Chinese OGPU/NKVD agent-officers were recruited from KUTV (the Communist University of the Toilers of the East). Aleev and Lutskaia (Lutskaya) were a husband and wife team who were the same age, born 1904 in China. They had joined and infiltrated the Kuomintang. They attended the Chinese Communist University (unknown if in China or the USSR) and shortly after their graduation in December 1929, they were suddenly living in Chita, Russia.

Seven of the eight Chinese OGPU/NKVD and or GRU agents were born in China. Pyotr Vasilievich Grigorsky is the exception. He was born in 1905 near Nerchinsk, Russia at the Kazanovo mines. It is assumed that his father was a Chinese miner. Ivan Gavrilovich Tulumbaev (born Li Fong Jiang in 1912) appears to have arrived in Russia at a very young age and to have begun working in the GRU while in his teens. His story has parallels with that of Ven Sian Liu. Of the eight in Tepliakov's Oprichniki Stalina only Tulumbaev and Tu Xiang served in the GRU. They along with Grigorsky did not appear to have finished their higher education (a diploma). But Grigorsky's file had very little information. Interestingly, Tu Xiang was assigned as an agent or political commissar at the Komsomol University in Kharbarovsk and CLS (Chinese-Lenin School) in Vladivostok. It's unclear if he was also a student/cadet while working.

The remaining five, including Lenintsev (Khou Mintsi), who was probably the most renowned of all of them, studied at KUTV. Lenintsev's identity while a KUTV student (1927 to May 1930) was Kazimir Lantsutskii. He was born in Shanxi Province in 1905 and arrived in Vladivostok (illegally) in 1926. Lenintsev served as an infantryman, translator and in military intelligence during the Sino-Soviet War of 1929. He fought for the Soviets and helped them interrogate captured Chinese soldiers. Lenintsev served in the INO, NKVD in Manchuria and China proper beginning around May 1931. In Shanghai, he worked as an illegal (illegals typically used forged documents, passports and false identities from May 1930 to late 1931-1932) with the task of re-establishing links with Shanghai Chinese CP leaders and CP union leaders in hiding after the Shanghai Massacre that began April 12, 1927. This mission was a complete failure. In June 1932, he returned to Manchuria and served with the Transbaikal units of the INO, OGPU/NKVD serving with several if not all of the Chinese OGPU/NKVD agents listed on the RGASPI document (on this MM page) and several if not all of the agent-officers listed in Tepliakov's Oprichniki Stalina. "Eastern Siberia" (on the RGASPI document, it's written "Eastern Siberian" NKVD) is analogous to the Transbaikal region (Chita, Irkutsk, Ulan-Ude and thereabouts). It was said that Lenintsev was a very affable and likeable person and for that reason, he survived (despite being incarcerated and tortured for over a year) the purges of the Great Terror (1936-1939). From 1945 to 1950, Sergei Mikhailovich (Khou Mintsi) was in Chita where at least during part of this time, he served as a translator for Pu Yi and his retinue who were held by the USSR.  According to his daughter, Lenintsev served on many secret missions and assignments for the USSR that he will never get credit for. In 1968, at the height of the tensions between China and USSR, Lenintsev was sacked from his job because of his nationality (that is, his ethnicity; he was a Soviet citizen). His daughter said with a bit of dry wit and sarcasm "вот социализм."

Many of the ethnic Chinese, Soviet intelligence officers served the USSR in the 1920s to the 1940s and 1950s by teaching Chinese at various institutes and learning centers in the USSR when not employed in "special operations" abroad. All of the listed eight in Oprichniki Stalina served Soviet intelligence by participating in missions throughout China (all of the major cities and regions especially Shanghai and Beijing). One or two ran Communist cells in China. Others, when not sent abroad, appeared to have worked in industries and cities where Chinese laborers were abundant and where translators and commissars were needed such as in the Transbaikal region (near Chita and Irkutsk). Atom Atomovich Kristal (also spelled Kristall in the RGASPI file) was born in China in 1903. He arrived in the USSR in 1921 and began studying at KUTV finishing his degree in 1924. From 1924 to 1927, he was in China where on the instructions of the Chinese CP, he infiltrated the Kuomintang. Later, he studied at the Moscow Military Engineering School. After his second degree, he began work in the mines of Eastern Siberia most probably as a political commissar among the Chinese miners. (Few would leave Moscow for the dearth of comforts in Eastern Siberia in 1935 except on assignment). This history has strong parallels to that of Khai Ir Ti. There is no information on Tatyana Kaspina in Oprichniki Stalina.

Perhaps, there remains an unfound treasure trove of information about the Chinese and Soviet Chinese who studied at KUTK (the Chinese Sun Yat-sen University in Moscow) and then served in operation Maki-Mirage (and Soviet intelligence). This university (by its namesake) would appear to have produced more Soviet intelligence officers of East Asian background than KUTV. But there have not been many, if any documents released concerning the former and its graduates in regards to intelligence work. Perhaps, the Kaspina file can shed some light if and when it is found and or released.

Evaluations of Imperial Japanese espionage 

After the conclusion of World War II, Major General Shun Akikusa, the leader of Japanese intelligence in Manchukuo, reported that of the twenty or so agents that the Japanese had trained, only three had ever reported back while on Russian soil (likely through signals intelligence). Unfortunately, the three did not send any intelligence information ever.

According to A.M. Nair, an Indian instructor at the Japanese intelligence school in Hsinking (Changchun), Manchuria, they trained some thirty Koreans who crossed over into the Russian Far East. None ever reported back. After 1945-46, some of the very same men that Nair trained were now working as Soviet cadres in North Korea. This leads to the conclusion that many if not most were simply Soviet double agents.

Further, there is an American intelligence report based on interrogations of Japanese intelligence officials and officers which was commissioned on Feb. 28, 1950 under the command of General Douglas MacArthur and entitled "Japanese Intelligence on Soviet Intentions near End of World War II." The report was composed from interrogations with several colleagues of Shun Akikusa including: Hiroshi Oshima (Berlin Military Attache), Michitake Yamaoka (Moscow Military Attache), the Private Secretary, Kanyei Chuyo (head of Japanese Naval Intelligence), Seizo Arisue (head of the Intelligence Bureau), and Masao Yoshizumi, lieutenant-general and head of Military Affairs Bureau. The report stated that the Japanese tried to recruit White Russians, Koreans and Manchurians but no reliable reports or information came as a result. Espionage was described as the "least valuable" component of Japanese state intelligence, and those few agents by which Japan did use to transfer information were White Russian emigres, although many of them were Soviet agents.

Author Aleksandr Kulanov wrote that the Japanese officers Michitaro Komatsubara, Hikosaburo Hata, and "the entire Russian department of the Japanese secret police fell victim to an enormous OGPU and military intelligence effort of disinformation, from the year 1937 onward."

Kuromiya and Pepłoński's research stated that, "By one Japanese estimate, only less than 5 percent of Japan’s attempts at penetrating Soviet territory succeeded in the 1930s, whereas the success rate of the Soviet penetration of Manchurian territory was at least 65 percent." The scholars also cited another Japanese history by former counterintelligence officers which described Manchuria in 1937 as an atmosphere of "unprecedented international espionage."

Structure of Soviet espionage 

Broadly, the Soviets sought to create a worldwide network of spies, and even internal counterintelligence often involved active and offensive rather than passive tactics. Soviet counterintelligence agencies performed active measures abroad, such as in Manchuria, China, and Korea during Maki Mirage. The Soviet Union spent much of its intelligence resources on forward operations rather than on nominal counter-intelligence. Soviet intelligence recruited agent-officers from among students, former soldiers, policemen (also former Red Guards) and Soviet cadres to join the GRU and the INO, NKVD. The main function of each group was to send agents abroad in intelligence missions. The INO refers to the "foreign division" of the Soviet political police (OGPU/NKVD). The GRU (military intelligence) used its operatives almost exclusively for operations overseas. The INO was renamed and restructured between different Soviet secret police and espionage agencies, as were the Soviet security agencies themselves.

Context of Maki Mirage 
One major factor in the importance of the Operation Maki Mirage is that it opens up the door to research on other operations run by the INO, NKVD using the other Soviet diaspora peoples – especially those using Soviet Germans and Poles overseas used in the large network of operation in the Red Orchestra and those using operatives to infiltrate the Polish Promethean Movement. Additionally, because of the dearth of information, much of the depth revealed in Maki Mirage can provide new information on Soviet intelligence (and continuities) and their use of Soviet human resources. According to Chang, although it is not especially revelatory in regards to tactics, it reveals more by being comparable to Soviet operations such as Trust (Trest), Syndicate-2 and others while possibly exceeding them in scope.

The existence of Operation Maki Mirage exonerates the Soviet "smaller nations" and the diaspora peoples from the false charges of disloyalty that were deployed against them during Stalinism, along with charges of lack of assimilation of Soviet values, foreign ties and as being vectors for foreign agentura (agents). These charges are pronounced, falsified and repeated in the state archives of Russia and the former USSR. The hypothesis of "Soviet xenophobia", which claims that Soviet deportations and ethnic cleansing were motivated by security or Marxist ideology rather than nationalistic chauvinism, is contradicted by the service of the deported nationalities to the Soviet Union.

In his memoirs, Soviet spy Pavel Sudoplatov stated that in 1942, the INO, NKVD had a force of twenty-thousand including administrative staff using Americans, Chinese, Vietnamese, Poles, Romanians, Czechs, Spaniards and many other nationalities (such as the ones listed by Trepper). It consisted of sixteen sections, two of which conducted operations in China and the "far east." There remained fourteen other sections of the INO, NKVD and probably eighteen thousand other agent-officers and administrative staff. Incidentally, the 1937 All-Soviet census reported 270,730 total employees for the NKVD. This number includes agents-officers, executive branch and administrative staff. With all of these numbers in mind, one can understand that 20,000 in the INO, NKVD was no exaggeration. As a matter of fact, by the end of WWII, the INO, NKVD was probably even larger (certainly the NKVD grew from 1937 to 1945).

These agents were also used overseas most probably in Europe, Scandinavia and the Mediterranean including Turkey (Soviet Poles, Germans, Greeks, Finns and Oghuz speaking Turks). There is little evidence of this because no one went into their communities in the former USSR to collect photos, interviews and histories. (For this reason, the interviews below are absolutely invaluable and rare as they were conducted within the former USSR and not among emigres). These remaining 18,000 in the INO, NKVD and GRU were being paid extremely well (less so the GRU agents- military intelligence) and their families were given nomenklatura privileges. The salaries, privileges (nomenklatura shops, schools, hospitals, etc.) and special apartments cost the Soviet state an "arm and a leg" and thus, it would have logically demanded that their agents put their lives on the line in "special operations." Sudoplatov also mentioned Poles, Ukrainians, and Germans being recruited as agents by the Soviets during the Molotov-Ribbentrop Pact negotiations, proclaiming to be refugees from communism.

The various set of operations carried out by Operation Maki Mirage from approximately 1920 to 1945 were only a fraction of Soviet intelligence operations carried out overseas using Soviet operatives. Surprisingly, in spite of the Great Terror (and the fear of "foreign nationalities and their influences"), Soviet minorities were utilized heavily in these operations. Despite the nationalities deportations, these operations, planned and led by the INO, NKVD (4th directorate, foreign department of the secret police) employed all or almost all of the Soviet diaspora peoples. They recruited Soviet Greeks, Poles, Germans, Chinese, Koreans, speakers of the Oghuz Turkic languages (Tatars, Azerbaijanis, Pontic Greeks, Meskhetian Turks) and others sending them to nations, regions and communities where their co-ethnics resided and their titular languages were spoken.

The operations run by the INO, NKVD refute the Soviet claim and that of its supporters that some could not be remade as loyal Soviet citizens or that they had not shown absolute loyalty to Soviet power. In the case of Maki Mirage, large numbers of foreign Chinese students and the Soviet Chinese and Koreans volunteered for these operations despite the deportation of their communities.

Archive openings and historical methodology 
The historiography and intelligence collected on the Chinese-Lenin School were secret until 2012. Archives and other research and depictions of Operation Maki Mirage were published by the Russian Federation from 2000 to 2014 

Between 2006 and 2018, the American historian Chang interviewed former Soviet Chinese and Korean families in the Russian Far East, Uzbekistan, and Kyrgyzstan. He came across seven families of former Soviet GRU and or NKVD agent officers and recorded the interviews with six of the seven families on video or mp3, scanning family pictures and taking pictures of the interviewees. He sought to gather evidence that did not rely exclusively on Soviet-era archives, which had marginalized national minorities and had written them out of history.

In 2012, China’s Ambassador to Russia, Li Hui commissioned the writing of The Chinese Diaspora in Vladivostok to be a monograph written in Russian and Chinese. They and their Russian counterparts helped to select the authors, Dmitrii Ancha and Nelli G. Miz. Additionally with diplomatic help, the Russian Federation temporarily opened the previously closed NKVD/KGB/FSB archival documents, which allowed the authors to pen one chapter on the Chinese-Lenin School of Vladivostok and its activities specifically that of training and providing agents for Operation Maki Mirage. These files on the Chinese-Lenin School had been previously off-limits. In 2015, Ancha and Miz produced a 2nd edition of Chinese Diaspora in Vladivostok in Russian. The bibliography for the 2nd edition (as well as the first) covered all chapters except the one on the Chinese-Lenin School. The Russian archives in Vladivostok were later made unavailable to researchers.

Post-Soviet Russian documentary films and articles on Operation Maki Mirage are historically problematic because they lack mention of the hundreds of East Asian agents from 1920 to 1945, focusing mainly on "European" or "Russian" agents, despite the feats of loyalty and bravery demonstrated by the East Asian officers and key role of linguistic and cultural awareness in the espionage activities.

The archives themselves were historically purged during the Soviet era, as were many of the participants in Maki-Mirage. Ancha and Miz's research based on the Soviet archives found that at least 180 out of 400 students of the Chinese-Lenin School were purged as "suspect nationalities". The number of Chinese students trained in espionage at the CLS, KUTV (Communist University of the Toilers of the East) and the Moscow Sun Yat-sen University declined during the Great Terror as most faced immense persecution. Many who survived the terror returned to China to be arrested and interrogated as Stalin concurrently launched the Chinese deportation of 1937-38 (which contained three waves of deportations).

Korenizatsiia (Soviet indigenization) and the construction of the Chinese-Lenin School 

Beginning in the 1920s, the Bolsheviks began to construct, consolidate and educate the Chinese and Koreans of the Russian Far East as "Soviet peoples." One major reason was the growing market influence of the Japanese Empire and the Bolsheviks reliance on Japan for hard currency in exchange for resources such as timber, natural gas, minerals and petroleum from the Russian Far East, and especially Sakhalin. Japan already controlled Korea and was setting up various military and political alliances as well as business ventures in Manchuria. Both countries were business partners, political rivals for the other country’s leaders, neighbors and military rivals contesting the same geographies.

On October 29, 1923, the Primorskii provincial Communist Party voted to begin investment in large scale infrastructure construction (schools, universities, radio stations, publishing houses and roads) in the Russian Far East to support their political, educational and occupational campaigns for the Chinese and Koreans there. This was called korenizatsiia (indigenization), a sort of "Sovietization" program which would assimilate and integrate national minorities into the institutions of the socialist state through ideological campaigns at work, school and through radio and newspapers. This socio-political policy and movement took place from 1923 to 1934. The Bolsheviks wanted to organize the "construction" of the Chinese and Koreans of the RFE as Soviet peoples while increasing their educational networks (school systems), the number of "socialist" books, pamphlets and other materials and increase the recruitment efforts towards East Asians into Party institutions (as cadres) and as labor union members. The USSR would guard their borders with both military might and ideology (Soviet socialism). 

There were immediate benefits for the Koreans and Chinese because most Asians were laborers. The "red corners" throughout the USSR would teach the foreign laborers the rudiments of speaking, writing and reading Russian while providing breaks (while on the job) and reading materials. Some large factories even had rabfaks which were small schools/classrooms in the factory or workplace where workers could study from one to three hours a day.

On June 4, 1925, the Chinese section of the Primorskii Provincial Soviet Party School was formed. On March 1, 1933, this entity formally became the Chinese Lenin School in Vladivostok (CLS). Initially, there were 207 students. The students were separated into those studying at the preparatory stage, middle stage (secondary education) and higher education (university level). In the first year of the CLS, there were only 43 students studying at the university level.

Learning "tradecraft" and preparation for Operation Maki Mirage 
The Chinese-Lenin School was established with three main directives/goals: one, the teaching and educating future Chinese and Korean comrades/socialists, two, the creation of a publishing house for the translation of socialist literature in the Chinese language and three, the establishment of a recruitment and training center for East Asian (Koreans and Chinese) agents of Soviet intelligence. The OGPU/NKVD also included a subdivision, the INO (the Foreign Division of the Soviet political police) and the acronym GRU (Soviet military intelligence) also included two further subdivisions, the RO, OKDVA among others. OKDVA signified "the Intelligence Division" and "the Counter-intelligence Division" of "the Special Banner Far Eastern Army."

All of these affiliated agent-officers participated in Operation Maki Mirage. Some students at the CLS who were referred to as "cadets", had been recruited from the Soviet intelligence organs. The cadets who were recruited from the GRU and OGPU/NKVD also monitored the students and the everyday life of the university (reactions to various courses, discussions, political thought among various groups at the university, who had influence and why). The CLS served to train qualified intelligence officers to work behind the "cordon" (behind Soviet borders) on the territory of the Japanese puppet state of Manchukuo. The staff of the school was selected not only from Chinese and Russians who had Soviet citizenship as well as Chinese citizens and those who arrived from illegally from Manchukuo. Most students were Chinese from China as well as some who were from the USSR. Regarding the composition of Koreans, most of the Koreans at the CLS were ex-military and former NKVD officers.

Those who were selected to become intelligence agents, that is, the cadets, were given false names to study under. In addition to a general training regime, Comrade Usenko taught the student cadets how to shoot a gun on the run and shooting on a target range. The cadets practiced their "tradecraft" two to three times a month visiting safe houses in which they had to pass certain tests working with various types of equipment. There are some parallels with the Nakano school and the evolution of intelligence tradecraft in the 1930s. Both schools wanted well-rounded, well-educated recruits. The students learned all the basics of Soviet spycraft, including intelligence, counter-intelligence, guerrilla warfare, radio communication, and techniques in spycraft/espionage. They were also directed to keep in excellent physical condition. Comrades Mastis and Zybalov gave the cadets lessons in weightlifting and boxing. They were supervised by the Primorsky regional administration of the NKVD secret police.

Over 1200 agents participated in Maki Mirage. Of these, about 400 agents were recruited from Vladivostok's Chinese-Lenin School from 1924 to Spring 1938, of which at least 180 were repressed in the Great Terror through 1939. About 300 agents were Koreans or Chinese from KUTV (Communist University of Toilers in the East in Moscow), and 300 Koreans or Chinese from KUTK (Moscow Sun Yat Sen University). About 200 agents were not trained for "missions" at a Soviet university, but were Koreans and Chinese from the Red Army, Soviet enterprises, teachers and cadres at Soviet institutions. Additionally, some of the cadets at the Soviet espionage universities were not all students themselves but were veterans of the RO, OKDVA (Special Red Banner Far Eastern Army) and INO (Foreign intelligence).

Soviet operational and tactical espionage 
In the first half of the 1930s, there were periodic cessations of the use of East Asian agents as Japanese penetration was suspected and all East Asian agents would be suspended, despite a lack of evidence for any threat or any major extension of Japanese intelligence into Soviet territory, the Soviets were suspicious of diaspora nationalities. The NKVD purportedly exposed "brotherhoods" and "regional land-based brotherhoods" of "Japanese spies" among Chinese students as an excuse to perpetrate the mid-1930s purge.

All "cadets" had to be ready at a moment’s notice for training or work to be sent to Manchuria on a training mission whether simply reconnaissance or to perform acts of sabotage. Ancha and Miz's Chinese Diaspora gives profiles of cadets-turned-students who enrolled at the Chinese-Lenin School (CLS) in the mid-1930s. They are emblematic of what Soviet intelligence wanted in their officers, first-hand knowledge of Manchuria.

Vei Lianshan (born Ui Lianshan) worked in intelligence for the OKDVA. He was involved in leading an underground anti-Japanese movement in Manchuria. His group and work was uncovered in 1934. In that year, Vei Lianshan crossed the border from Sakhalien (now Heihe, China) to Blagoveshchensk and was reassigned to study at the CLS in 1936.

The second cadet was Van Vychin. It appears that he was a GRU agent who was sent to Manchuria fighting in an anti-Japanese partisan unit. He would repeatedly pass information to Soviet intelligence about the Japanese army. In 1936, he enrolled in the Chinese-Lenin School but was arrested and repressed in 1938 during the Great Terror.

Fan Shohua (real name is Wang Juntou) was born in 1912 and served as an intelligence agent in the RO, OKDVA. As part of his work, he repeatedly crossed the Soviet-Manchurian border. In late 1936, he returned illegally from Sakhalien [Heihe], China to the USSR. Beginning in early 1937, he was enrolled at the Chinese-Lenin School.

In Operation Maki Mirage the Soviets in Manchuria would treat their operations like they were nearly on their own home soil. They recruited many agents who had some knowledge of Manchuria having served there during the 1929 Sino-Soviet War and many who stayed there afterwards leading various Soviet NRA (Soviet partisan grounds on Manchuria soil). They would use tactics much like that of guerrilla warfare employing multiple levels of deception to distract the enemy at the border.

In other areas, they would carry out acts of diversion or simply allow themselves to be caught (being arrested with false papers, and other kinds of actions attracting the attention of authorities) while allowing those who were sent to carry out the "special tasks," a much higher chance of succeeding and escaping. ("Special tasks" refers to the hard, punitive or murderous actions carried out by OGPU/NKVD agents). But the Japanese, Chinese and Tsarist Whites (including sub-groups of Monarchists, Russian Fascists, etc.) in Manchuria had very little knowledge about one hidden layer of operational deception and that was the employment of hundreds of East Asian agents in Soviet intelligence, while conspicuous Russian agents were the center of focus for anti-Soviet intelligence such as by the Japanese.

The historian Hiroaki Kuromiya sums up the information Akikusa gave to his captors (Akikusa also died in Soviet captivity). Kuromiya also called Maki Mirage and Dreamers "deception" operations (typically to hide one’s own "forward" operations). Case studies of specific Soviet agents can show the general outline of what the Soviets were doing at this time.

Ven Sian Liu was born in 1904 to a rural family from China, and his parents had died en route to Vladivostok. At the age of nine taken in by the Popov family, both doctors, Ven Sian joined the Red Army immediately after the October Revolution at the age of 14. Fighting in Europe during the Russian Civil War, Ven Sian was eventually transferred to the GRU, military intelligence. He worked in surveillance over "immigrants" the contemporary term by the Soviet state for Chinese and Korean residents of the Soviet Far East, most born in the USSR. Following this, Ven Sian participated in the undeclared "war against the Japanese", covert operations in Manchuria that occurred in the 1930s before WWII. In 1937, he engaged in two GRU operations in Manchuria, but returned home and found out that his Korean wife and her son had been deported to Uzbekistan. His Korean wife's son died soon after the deportation to Kazakhstan. His wife blamed Ven Sian for her son's death and this ended their marriage. Despite this, Ven Sian Liu continued to work for the Soviet police MVD as an indirect employee of the state. Later he fought in WWII in the defense against Germany and performed reconnaissance. After the war, he ran a store in Bukhara.

Van in Zun was the chief (nachalʹnik) of the Chinese NKVD regiments, while Khan Chan Ger was the head of the Korean NKVD regiments—each regiment participated in the deportation of their nationalities. The list of participants in the Maki Mirage documentary Agent Prizrak (Ghost Agent) listed only two East Asian NKVD officers, Khan Chan Ger and Van In Zun. Yet, because of the Soviet deportations of the Chinese and the Koreans and the photos obtained (which are present on this page), we know that there were NKVD regiments made up of only Chinese and Koreans respectively. Thus, the listing of the regimental leaders Khan and Van hints at a much larger recruitment, participation and roles played by the Soviet Chinese and Koreans in Maki Mirage. The pictures above from Blagoveshchensk are indicative of the missions (3 Koreans in one photo and 3 Chinese in another). They are on the Chinese border in Blagoveshchensk expressly to begin their operations (and not for sightseeing). Official photos were taken because they were to embark on the said missions.

Khai Ir Ti was an NKVD operative who emigrated from Manchuria to Chernogorsk in 1934, becoming a translator from 1935 to 1941, through the Great Purge.

See also 
 Japan–Soviet Union relations
 Sino-Soviet relations

References

Footnotes

Bibliography 

 
 
 
 
 
 
 
 
 
 
 
 
 
 
 
 
 
 
 
 
 
 
 
 
 
 
 
 
 
  Note that S. Nikolaev was simply the "pen name" for Nikolai S. Chumakov, a former Colonel in the KGB and historian of the KGB/FSB

External links 

 Ven Sian Liu: A Soviet Chinese GRU Agent-Officer, 1920 to 1944 [interview]
 Anna Vasilevna Ti: My Father, the NKVD and the Great Terror [interview]
 Anna Vasilevna Ti: GRU Agents in Manchuria [interview]
 Russian documentary, "Operation Ghost Agent" (Операция «Агент призрак»), 2013 [documentary]

False flag operations
Military history of the Soviet Union
Soviet Union intelligence operations
1920s in the Soviet Union
1930s in the Soviet Union
1940s in the Soviet Union
Japan–Soviet Union relations
History of Manchuria
China–Soviet Union relations
Interwar period
Manchukuo